The following lists events the happened during 2011 in Gabon.

Incumbents
 President: Ali Bongo Ondimba
 Prime Minister: Paul Biyoghé Mba

Events

January
January 26 - The government dissolves the main opposition party accusing one of its leaders of committing treason.
January 28 - Police fire tear gas on anti-government demonstrators two days after opposition leader André Mba Obame declares him president.

References

 
Years of the 21st century in Gabon
Gabon
Gabon
2010s in Gabon